Dragon Cliff is a basaltic monolith located on western Axel Heiberg Island, Nunavut, Canada. It is the most striking feature of Expedition Fiord and rises several hundred metres out of the fiord. It is part of the Albian Strand Fiord Formation, which in turn forms part of the High Arctic Large Igneous Province. The Strand Fiord Formation is interpreted to represent the cratonward extension of the Alpha Ridge.

See also
Volcanism in Canada

References

Stratigraphy of Nunavut
Cliffs of Canada